Mansour with Dragh and Baghdad International Fair, is the 62nd neighborhood within Mansour district, Baghdad. It is the 62nd neighbourhood of Baghdad. It is located in the middle of Baghdad, which for decades held a lot of school, shops and zoos such as the baghdad zoo. By 2007, Mansour had become unsafe as car bombings, kidnappings and killings by extremists became common. By 2009 the neighborhood had become somewhat safer, with residents returning to their daily routines. In close proximity to central Baghdad, Mansour was and still an upper-class neighbourhood that contains malls, universities and parks.

History 
The neighbourhood is named after Abu Jaafar Al-Mansur, the second caliph of the Abbasid Caliphate and the founder of Baghdad.

Displacement
As a result of a mass exodus of original families, Mansour has seen an influx of families from other areas. These families are trying to escape the increased danger of the new comers in Hayy Al-Jihad, Iskan and Al-Shu'ala. In order to curb this migration, the new arrivals are required to produce a recommendation from an Imam and a friend, relative or neighbour.

Education

Baghdad High School for Girls is in Mansour,
Al mansour middle school for boys

See also
Mansour district

References

Neighborhoods in Baghdad

ar:حي المنصور